The Select Committee on the Transportation and Sale of Meat Products, also known as the Vest Committee, after its first chairman Senator George G. Vest of Missouri, was a select committee of the United States Senate from 1887 – 1921. It was established to consider various aspects of the meat packing industry.

History

The committee was formed in response to complaints by cattle producers and ranchers of abuse by major meat packers. It was the first investigation of the meat packing industry by U.S. Congress. One of the committee's first hearings was in St. Louis in November 1888 to investigate allegations that the "Big Four" meatpackers in Chicago were trying to "freeze out" competitors. In 1890, the committee issued a report that found no evidence of collusion by the major meat packers, but outlined various incidences of price fixing in the beef industry.

The committee's report stated, in part:

The principal cause of the depression in the prices paid to the cattle raiser and of the remarkable fact that the cost of beef to the consumer has not decreased in proportion, comes from the artificial and abnormal centralization of markets, and the absolute control by a few operators thereby made possible.

In place of the old system when shippers and butchers went from one cattle raiser to another, competing in the purchase of cattle, there is now a concentration of the market at a few points ... So far has this centralizing process continued that for all practical purposes the [Chicago] market ... dominates absolutely the price of beef cattle in the whole country.

Chairmen

Sources

Report of the Select Committee on the Transportation and Sale of Meat Products, Senate Report No. 829, 51st Congress, 1st Session. United States Senate. Government Printing Office. May 1890.

Transportation and Sale of Meat Products
Meat packing industry
Meat processing in the United States